The Robin Toner Program in Political Reporting was established in 2009 to celebrate the life and work of Robin Toner, the late New York Times political correspondent. It is awarded by the S.I. Newhouse School of Public Communications of Syracuse University.

The program includes the annual Toner Prize for Excellence in Political Reporting and Toner Prize Celebration. The award, which includes $5,000, is presented at an annual ceremony that features a distinguished speaker. In 2016, then-President Barack Obama delivered the keynote address. 

Entries are judged on how well they reflect the high standards and depth of reporting that marked Toner's work. In particular, the judges look for how well the entries:

 illuminate the electoral process or
 reveal the politics of policy and
 engage the public in democracy.

Entries must be fact-based reporting, not commentary. Single articles, series or a body of work are eligible. Books are ineligible.

Toner Prize recipients

Toner Prize Celebration speakers

References

External links
 

Syracuse University
Awards established in 2009
American journalism awards
2009 establishments in New York (state)
2009 establishments in Washington, D.C.